Holmen or Holmens (in genitive) means a small island or islet in Danish, Norwegian, and Swedish, and may refer to:

Places

Denmark
 Holmen, Copenhagen, a district in central Copenhagen
 Holmen Church, church in central Copenhagen
 Holmen Cemetery, oldest cemetery in Copenhagen
 Holmens Kanal, street in central Copenhagen
 Holmen Naval Base, naval base, today mainly located in Nyholm, Copenhagen

Norway
 Holmen, Oslo, a village in Asker municipality, Akershus county
 Holmen (station), a station on the Røa Line of the Oslo Metro system
 Holmenkollen, a mountain and a neighbourhood in the Vestre Aker borough of Oslo; known for its international skiing competitions
 Holmen IF, a sports club from Asker
 Holmen Hockey, the ice hockey division of Holmen IF
 Holmen, Målselv, a hamlet in Målselv municipality, Troms og Finnmark county
 Holmen Church (Sigdal), principal parish church for Sigdal municipality, located at Prestfoss

United States
 Holmen, Wisconsin,  a village in southwest Wisconsin
 Holmen High School

Other
 Holmen (surname)
 Holmen (company), a Swedish forest industry group

See also 
 -hou  
 Holm (disambiguation)
 Holme (disambiguation)
 Holmes (disambiguation)